Sky School or SKY School may refer to:

 SKY (universities), South Korea
 Alama Education, previously Sky School, UK